Cho Gu-ham (born 30 July 1992) is a South Korean retired judoka. He competed at the 2016 Summer Olympics in the men's 100 kg event, in which he was eliminated in the third round by Artem Bloshenko.

References

External links
 
 
 
 

1992 births
Living people
Sportspeople from Gangwon Province, South Korea
South Korean male judoka
Judoka at the 2016 Summer Olympics
Olympic judoka of South Korea
Judoka at the 2014 Asian Games
Judoka at the 2018 Asian Games
Asian Games silver medalists for South Korea
Asian Games bronze medalists for South Korea
Asian Games medalists in judo
Medalists at the 2014 Asian Games
Medalists at the 2018 Asian Games
Universiade medalists in judo
World judo champions
Universiade gold medalists for South Korea
Universiade silver medalists for South Korea
Medalists at the 2013 Summer Universiade
Medalists at the 2015 Summer Universiade
Medalists at the 2020 Summer Olympics
Judoka at the 2020 Summer Olympics
Olympic medalists in judo
Olympic silver medalists for South Korea
21st-century South Korean people